Walter Buch (24 October 1883 – 12 September 1949) was a German jurist as well as an SA and SS official during the Nazi era. He was Martin Bormann's father-in-law. As head of the Supreme Party Court, he was an important Party official. However due to his insistence on prosecuting major Party figures on moral issues, he alienated Adolf Hitler and his power and influence gradually diminished into insignificance. On 12 September of 1949, he committed suicide.

Early life and career
Born in Bruchsal, the son of a Senate President at the Baden High Court, Buch graduated from the gymnasium in Konstanz and entered military service in 1902 as an officer cadet. He became a career officer in the Imperial German Army and served in the First World War as a training officer and a company commander, earning the Iron Cross 1st and 2nd class. In 1918, he was released from the army as a Major when he refused to swear allegiance to the new Weimar Republic. He was then active in the Baden Veterans' League. From 1919 to 1922 he was a member of the German National People's Party (DNVP/Deutschnationale Volkspartei).

By December 1922, he had become a member of the Nazi Party (NSDAP) attracted by its virulent anti-semitism. By August of that year he was leader of the SA in Franconia. Buch was recruited as a member of this SS-forerunner organization.

Buch participated in the Beer Hall Putsch on 9 November 1923 and eluded capture as many other SA leaders fled the country. Buch came back to Munich as early as 13 November, sent by Hermann Göring – who had fled to Innsbruck – to ensure that the shaken Party troops' cohesion would not weaken. He built up ties with the now outlawed SA groups, which could now only operate undercover and briefly was charged with the leadership of the outlawed SA until arrested in February 1924. Buch maintained regular contact between Hitler, who was incarcerated in Landsberg prison, and the illegal Party leadership in Austria. In the time that followed, when the NSDAP was banned, Göring's fears began to come true as the party broke up. After Hitler was released from Landsberg in December 1924, he reestablished the Party on 27 February 1925. Buch soon rejoined, becoming the SA leader in Munich and serving in that capacity until November 1927.

Chairman of the Supreme Party Court
The Inquiry and Mediation Committee (Untersuchungs- und Schlichtungs-Ausschuss or USCHLA), had been established in December 1925 by Hitler to settle intra-party problems and disputes. On 27 November 1927, Hitler named Buch Acting Chairman of this body (permanent Chairman as of 1 January 1928). The USCHLA's headquarters were at the Brown House, Munich. In addition to the national organization, there were lower level USCHLA components at the Local and Gau levels. Their decisions could be appealed to the national USCHLA which specifically had the right to cite “higher Party reasons” as the sole justification for refusing to accept a lower level decision. Hitler used this to wield almost total control over intra-Party disputes. Buch did not have any formal legal training and tried to avoid choosing professional lawyers as Party judges, preferring to rely on old Party stalwarts (Alter Kämpfer) because he trusted them to share his outlook for the Party. The two other USCHLA members at the time of Buch's becoming chairman were Hans Frank and Ulrich Graf. 

Following the Nazi seizure of power, the USCHLA was renamed the Supreme Party Court (Oberste Parteigericht) on 1 January 1934. Buch was retained as its Chairman and also given the title of Oberster Parteirichter (Supreme Party Judge). The Court was empowered to conduct investigations, render judgments and take disciplinary actions against Party members. It could only impose sanctions that affected the accused’s relationship with the Party. The punishments could range from reprimand, to dismissal from Party offices and to the most extreme punishment, expulsion from the Party. If a case involved any criminal activity, the Court would refer the case to the criminal courts for action. However, any pronouncements of the Court were not binding on the criminal courts. The Court needed the concurrence of Hitler to effectuate its decisions, which at times he refused to grant.

In 1934, Buch described the importance of Party tribunals thus:

The Party tribunals always have themselves to consider as the iron fasteners that hold together the proud building of the Nazi Party, which political leaders and SA leaders have built up. Saving it from cracks and shocks is the Party tribunals' grandest task. The Party magistrates are bound only to their National Socialist conscience, and are no political leader's subordinates, and they are subject only to the Führer.

Buch acted in accordance with this belief in the purge of the SA leadership following the Night of the Long Knives in June 1934. Having amassed evidence against SA-Stabschef Ernst Röhm and his colleagues by gathering complaints about homosexual activities among SA members, Buch traveled at Hitler's behest to Bad Wiessee and was present at Röhm's arrest. Buch felt that Röhm and his fellow SA leaders should have faced the Supreme Party Court and was not informed of their summary executions until after the fact. However, Buch’s courts at all levels were very active in the subsequent extensive purge of SA personnel throughout the Reich. Buch reminded the tribunals that it was their duty to serve the Party, not “objective truth.” There are no accurate figures on the numbers of those expelled from the Party in the widespread purge, but they included members of the political organization as well as the SA.

Buch believed that National Socialism should foster a revolution in morality as well as in politics, and he sought to use his position to spearhead a crusade against vice and corruption. Buch did not confine himself merely to ruling in internal Party disputes, but also had Party members investigated or sanctioned for personal moral failings. Buch felt that marital fidelity and family stability were cornerstones of National Socialism. He often demanded punishment for moral offenses by senior Party leaders. These moral crusades earned him many enemies among his Party colleagues, including powerful Gauleiters such as Joseph Goebbels, Julius Streicher and Wilhelm Kube. In addition, Hitler had no strong reservations about leaders’ private lives so long as they remained personally loyal and avoided open scandal. As a consequence, Buch’s influence in the Party began to ebb, as can be demonstrated by several high profile cases against leading Party figures:

•	In late 1935, the Gauleiter of Kurmark, Wilhelm Kube, began an affair with his secretary, impregnated her and began divorce proceedings against his wife. Buch was outraged by these actions and scolded the Gauleiter in writing for his adulterous affair and for tolerating similar behavior by his subordinates. The Party Court began an investigation into allegations of corruption, favoritism and nepotism in his management of the Gau and issued a stern reprimand. However, Hitler was reluctant to remove one of his old comrades and summoned Buch to the Reich Chancellery for a personal rebuke on 14 November. Then in April 1936, an anonymous letter charged that Buch's wife was half-Jewish. In the course of a Gestapo investigation, it came to light that the letter had been written by Kube, in an attempt to get revenge on Buch. The Supreme Party Court issued an official reprimand in August 1936 and removed Kube from all his posts. Only on Hitler's orders was Kube allowed to retain the rank and uniform of an “honorary” Gauleiter. This whole sordid affair did nothing to restore Buch to Hitler’s good graces.

•	Buch was also responsible for the whitewashing of Party members' excesses during the nationwide Kristallnacht pogrom of 9 November 1938. Only 30 Party members were charged and most all had their cases dismissed or were given mild punishments. Buch’s report, issued in February 1939, declared that the killings that had taken place were “committed on the basis of a vague or presumed order … but motivated by hatred against Jews … [or] motivated by a resolution suddenly formed in the excitement of the moment.” He refused to hold the defendants responsible for following orders. However, his naming of Reichsminister of Propaganda Joseph Goebbels as the instigator of the “vague order” further alienated Buch from the Nazi leadership.

•	In early 1940, Buch began proceedings against Julius Streicher, the Gauleiter of Gau Franconia for behavior viewed as so irresponsible that he was embarrassing the party leadership. He was accused of keeping Jewish property seized after Kristallnacht; of spreading untrue stories about Hermann Göring – alleging that he was impotent and that his daughter Edda was conceived by artificial insemination; and of immoral personal behavior, including open adultery. He was brought before the Supreme Party Court and on 16 February 1940 was judged to be "unsuitable for leadership" and stripped of his party offices. However, Hitler considered Streicher one of his oldest and most loyal comrades. He considered overturning the verdict and removing “the old fool” Buch but, in the end, he settled for permitting Streicher to retain the title of Gauleiter and to continue as the publisher of Der Stürmer. This episode further strained Buch’s relationship with Hitler.

•	In November 1941, Hitler dismissed the Gauleiter of Gau Westphalia-South, Josef Wagner, from his position and ordered that he face the Supreme Party Court. Wagner was charged with ideological deviation, by remaining in the Catholic Church and sending his children to convent school. In addition, his wife objected to the marriage of their daughter to an SS member. Wagner defended himself ably and, in February 1942, the Court exonerated him. Hitler angrily refused to ratify the Court’s decision and, responding to this high level rebuke, the Court was finally compelled to expel Wagner from the Party in October 1942.

After this latest episode Hitler resolved to act against Buch and, at the end of November 1942, Buch lost what powers still remained to him. Hitler decreed that the Court could no longer try cases involving ideological issues. In addition, Gauleiters were authorized to serve as courts of appeal for Party courts at the Gau level and Hitler delegated the power of confirming the Supreme Party Court’s decisions to the Chief of the Nazi Party Chancellery, Martin Bormann. Bormann incidentally was married to Buch's daughter Gerda, but was not on good terms with Buch. Bormann from then on at times nullified sentences pronounced by the Court and at other times interfered with its deliberations, indicating what decision he expected of it. Buch tried to maintain his independence of action but eventually refused to preside over Court sessions and effectively withdrew from his position. In post-war interrogations, he claimed to have offered to resign and join the army several times during the Second World War but that his offers were never accepted.

Other positions
Apart from his leadership of the Supreme Party Court, Buch held several other high level positions in the Nazi Party and government. On 20 May 1928, Buch was elected from electoral constituency 24 (Upper Bavaria-Swabia) as one of the first 12 Nazi Party deputies to the Reichstag. He would subsequently be elected from constituencies 15 (East Hanover) in 1933 and 29 (Leipzig) in 1936, and would serve continuously until the end of the Nazi regime. Buch served as the leader of the Youth Office (Jugendamt) in the Party’s national leadership (Reichsleitung) from June 1930 until 30 October 1931 when he was succeeded by Baldur von Schirach. On 18 December 1931, Buch was promoted to SA-Gruppenführer. He also served for a time up to 1933 as an editor at the Party newspaper Völkische Beobachter. On 2 June 1933, he was appointed by Hitler as a Reichsleiter, the second highest political rank in the Nazi Party. On 1 July 1933, Buch joined the Schutzstaffel (SS) and became an Honorary Leader (Ehrenführer) with the rank of SS-Gruppenführer; he would be promoted to SS-Obergruppenführer on 9 November 1934. On 1 April 1936 he was appointed to the staff of Heinrich Himmler, the Reichsführer-SS. On 3 October 1934, he was made a member of the Academy for German Law.

Imprisonment and suicide

Near the end of the war in Europe, Buch was arrested by American forces on 30 April 1945. He was categorized as a “major offender” by a denazification court on 3 July 1948 and sentenced to five years in a labor camp. An appeal on 29 July 1949 reaffirmed his status as a major offender but reduced his sentence to three and a half years and he was released on the basis of time served. A few weeks after his release from prison, on 12 September 1949, he ended his own life by slitting his wrists and throwing himself into the Ammersee. (Langener Zeitung, 16 September 1949)

Decorations and awards
 Iron Cross 2nd Class
 Iron Cross 1st Class
Nuremberg Party Day Badge, 1929
Honour Chevron for the Old Guard, February 1934
The Honour Cross of the World War 1914/1918 with Swords, 1934
Coburg Badge, 1935
 Blood Order (Commemorative Medal of the 9th of November 1923)

References

Bibliography

External links

1883 births
1949 suicides
Christian fascists
German National People's Party politicians
German nationalists
German newspaper editors
German Protestants
Holocaust perpetrators in Germany
Martin Bormann
Members of the Academy for German Law
Members of the Reichstag of Nazi Germany
Members of the Reichstag of the Weimar Republic
Nazi Party officials
Nazi Party politicians
Nazi propagandists
Nazis who committed suicide in Germany
Nazis who participated in the Beer Hall Putsch
People from Bruchsal
People from the Grand Duchy of Baden
Recipients of the Iron Cross (1914), 1st class
Recipients of the Iron Cross (1914), 2nd class
Reichsleiters
SS-Obergruppenführer
Sturmabteilung officers
German Army personnel of World War I